Ellen DeGeneres: Relatable is a 2018 American stand-up comedy special by comedian and television host Ellen DeGeneres. It premiered on December 18, 2018 on Netflix. Relatable was her first stand-up special since her 2003 HBO special, Ellen DeGeneres: Here and Now.

The special was performed at the Benaroya Hall in Seattle, Washington on August 22 and 23, 2018.

References

External links
 
 

2018 films
2010s American television specials
2018 comedy films
American comedy films
Relatable
Netflix specials
Works by Tig Notaro
LGBT-related television specials
2010s English-language films
Films directed by Joel Gallen
2010s American films